Zenas Ferry Moody (May 27, 1832  – March 14, 1917) was the seventh Governor of Oregon from 1882 to 1887.

Early life

Zenas Ferry Moody was born on May 27, 1832, in Granby, Massachusetts, to Thomas Hovey and Hannah Ferry. The family immigrated to Oregon Territory in 1851, traveling the Isthmus of Panama route. Moody was a surveyor and store keeper in Brownsville, Oregon until moving to Illinois in 1856. He then returned to Oregon in 1862 when he settled in The Dalles. At The Dalles he set up a general store and was responsible for surveying the Umatilla Indian Reservation. Then in 1865 he organized the Oregon & Montana Transportation Company. During his time in The Dalles he was a major shipper of Oregon wool from Eastern Oregon.

Politics

In 1880, he was elected to the Oregon House of Representatives. During his only term there, he also served as Speaker of the House. Then in 1882, Moody was elected as the seventh Governor of the state of Oregon. He took office on September 13, 1882 and served until January 12, 1887.

Family

Moody married Mary Stephenson in Brownsville on November 19, 1853. They would have five children, including Malcolm A. Moody, who would serve in the United States Congress, and Ralph E. Moody, who would serve in the Oregon House of Representatives and as assistant attorney general of Oregon.

Zenas was the nephew of William Montague Ferry, and the cousin of U.S. Senator Thomas W. Ferry.

Death
Moody died in Salem on March 14, 1917. He is buried in Salem's City View Cemetery.

References

External links 

 Z. F. Moody Biography on Oregon State Library website
 Public documents of Z. F. Moody on Oregon Secretary of State website
 Z. F. Moody Biography on Professional Land Surveyors of Oregon website

1832 births
1917 deaths
People from Granby, Massachusetts
Republican Party governors of Oregon
Speakers of the Oregon House of Representatives
Republican Party members of the Oregon House of Representatives
People from The Dalles, Oregon
Burials at City View Cemetery
19th-century American politicians
People from Brownsville, Oregon